Salman Natour (1949-2016) was a Palestinian writer and novelist, Born in Daliyat al-Karmel south of Haifa in 1949, and graduated in his hometown's high school then attained higher education in Jerusalem then in Haifa.

He was an editor for the cultural section of Al-Ittihad newspaper.

Natour published about 30 books among which was one book in Hebrew, a number in Arabic, and four books for children.

He died on February 15, 2016, following a heart attack.

References 

1949 births
2016 deaths
People from Daliyat al-Karmel
Israeli Druze
Arabic-language novelists
Hebrew-language playwrights
Modern Hebrew writers
Israeli Arab journalists